Arena do Grêmio is a multi-use stadium in Porto Alegre, Rio Grande do Sul. It was inaugurated on December 8, 2012.

It is used mostly for football matches and as the home stadium of Grêmio Foot-Ball Porto Alegrense, replacing the Estádio Olímpico Monumental. With a 60,540 capacity (55,662 current official capacity), the stadium is one of the most modern venues in South America.

Concept
A mile from the international airport of Porto Alegre and alongside the road way, the stadium site appeared  perfect to create a multifunctional urban center. The complex includes a Conference and Congress Center, hotel, a mall, housing, condominiums and parking. The arena itself intends to be functional year round.

The architectural firm PLARQ is responsible for the stadium projects design and concept and OAS is the general contractor.

History

In the mid-2000s, an idea came within the Grêmio, to build a new stadium to host matches of the Tricolor. The idea was carried out in 2006 with the beginning of the work viability studies. The objective was to make a self-sustaining stadium, unlike the Estádio Olímpico Monumental, that was already falling apart. In May 2006, the Grêmio's master patrimonial plan was formulated, which, precisely, headed the project. From there began a discussion about the construction place, in the current location of Olímpico or in a new place. In November 2006, aiming to dispel this doubt, was made a pre-feasibility study for the construction of a new stadium, with the Dutch company Amsterdam Advisory Arena. The conclusion was that the Estádio Olímpico would not meet the expectations of the club, due to high maintenance cost, age of construction, low standard of comfort, security and services, insufficient parking and location in very populated region. This combination of factors led the club to opt for building an Arena, with the financial assistance of partners, with the standard required by FIFA.

Beginning of construction
In October 2009, fences were installed to surround the region. On May 13, 2010, a flagpole with Grêmio's flag was inaugurated on the ground.

The official launch of the works took place on September 20, 2010, after a motorcade output from the Estádio Olímpico. On the same day, at the ceremony of start of construction, Hugo de León planted a patch of grass of Olímpico on the Arena ground after landing in a helicopter. Later, the former footballer represented symbolically the works to push the button on a machine and turn it on.

In late February 2011, about three hundred workers stopped their activities, protesting for better wages, working conditions and housing, days off to visit their families - as many workers were from the northeast of Brazil - and a longer rest. Requests were met quickly, and all worked back to full steam.

Important matches

Inauguration

2012 Match Against Poverty

First official match: Copa Libertadores 2013, First Stage (second leg)

International friendly: Brazil vs France

City derby

Brazilian Cup Final

2018 FIFA World Cup qualification

2017 Copa Libertadores Final 1st leg

2019 Copa América

Concerts

With the multi-use stadium concept, the Arena do Grêmio easily adapts to receive more different genres of shows and events. The first was to be held in April 2013, receiving a concert celebrating the 72 years old of singer Roberto Carlos, with a sold-out audience of 50,000. In June 2014, the Arena hosted the first show of the 2014 Green Valley World Tour, which was attended by the residents of the largest electronic music festival in the world and known as the "Maestros of Tomorrowland": Dimitri Vegas & Like Mike, to an audience of over 14,000 fans.

References

External links

Official website
Stadium information
Designs of stadium

Grêmio Foot-Ball Porto Alegrense
Football venues in Rio Grande do Sul
Sports venues completed in 2012